In the Eyes of God is the fifth studio album by the American noisegrind band Today Is the Day, released on July 20, 1999, by Relapse Records. It is the only album by the group to feature Brann Dailor and Bill Kelliher, who would both move on to form Mastodon. First issued in 1999 on CD and vinyl formats, the LP was a limited edition of 1,000 total: 900 black copies sold to the public, and 100 clear copies that were given away as gifts to the staff of Relapse.

In 2010, a deluxe reissue of the album was released as a CD, containing six demos written during the early stages of the album's production and a DVD that contain footage of a live concert filmed during the tour for the album. The 2010 reissue was released as an edition of 3000 The album was reissued again on CD and LP formats through The End Records, with digital and CD versions containing an extra disc containing early demo versions of each track on the album. The album's title track was originally written in response to the Waco siege.

Track listing

Accolades

Personnel 
Adapted from the album's liner notes.

Today Is the Day
Steve Austin – vocals, guitar, production, engineering, mixing, recording, mastering
Brann Dailor – drums
Bill Kelliher – bass

Production and design
Paul Booth – cover art
Dave Merullo – mastering

Release history

References

External links 
 
 In the Eyes of God at Bandcamp

1999 albums
Today Is the Day albums
Relapse Records albums